Alejandro Mosqueda Paz (born January 20, 1995), known professionally as Almighty, is a Cuban rapper and singer. He made his debut in 2015 with the song "Amárrate las Timber". He is known for the songs "Panda" with Farruko, a translation of Desiigner's original theme. He has collaborated with artists like Bad Bunny, Jon Z, Wisin, among others.

Since 2019, he has recorded songs with Christian artists like Gabriel Rodríguez EMC, Funky, Alex Zurdo, and Redimi2, where the song «Filipenses 1:6» was awarded as "Urban Christian Song" at the 2020 Tu Música Urbana Awards.

Career 
Born in Havana, Cuba on January 20, 1995, and raised in Carolina, Puerto Rico. He started producing and writing songs in his teens like "Alem el Pilar" and by that time was signed to Lunatik Records, with which he released some songs like "Camino a la Fama" and "Ninguno Tiene el Flow", later changing his name to "Almighty" explaining that this pseudonym "combines the initials of his name Alejandro Mosqueda", in addition to the fact that looking to the future it seemed to him that it would have a good commercial projection in the US market.

In 2015, he met Luisito el Virus, who worked with Farruko. Farruko gave him help to connect him with his own record label Carbon Fiber Music, thus signing a contract at the age of 20 years. After his debut, he released several singles, such as "Panda", which reached #36 on Hot Latin Songs and #23 on Latin Rhythm Airplay, "Aderall", "Panda (remix)", among others. Between 2015 and 2016, talented lyrical rappers like Pusho, el Sica and Tempo were surpassed by Almighty, thus earning respect from the urban genre where he is considered by many to be undefeated to this day. In 2017 after several problems with Lary Over, Almighty decided to launch his tiradera called "RIP Carbon" directed by Farruko, Lary Over and Benny Benni.

Following that, he decided to create his own record company entitled La Industria de los Inmortales, in which he has recorded with artists like Elvis Crespo with the song "Veo, Veo", and some singles such as: "Ocho", "Asalto", among others. He also works closely with Custom. In 2017, he became part of the Sony Music Latin company, an opportunity that he lost the following year. For the collaborative song "Solita" by Hear This Music, along with Ozuna, Bad Bunny and Wisin, he managed to enter the Billboard Hot Latin Songs list again, at #20.

Before his conversion to Christianity and due to a contract signed with Primo Boyz Music, he had to release and promote his debut album "La Bestia", and was presented with a concert in September 2019 at the Puerto Rico Convention Center. The album was on the Billboard Latin Rhythm Albums charts at #9 and on Top Latin Albums at #12. That same year, he released two Christian songs called "Hambre" and "Cristo Conmigo".

His first collaboration in the Christian sphere was with Redimi2 on «Filipenses 1:6», a song that ends with a prayer by a large part of the urban artists. This theme was the winner of the Tu Música Urbana Awards in the Urban Christian Song category and nominated for Spanish Language Recorded Song of the Year at the 2020 Dove Awards. The artists said that they did not let him go up to receive his prize for fear of what he was going to say. In 2019, he released his own version of Bryant Myers' song "Gan-Ga", where he titled it "Arpa". The theme handled the same instrumental but with Christian content. The song was soon removed from the YouTube platform.

In 2020, he began preparing his first Christian album called Genelipsis, where he has already released the songs "Monigotes" and "Mi Testimonio". In 2021, he announced through a live on his Instagram account that he is returning to secular music where he also played and explained what happened after dissing Myke Towers. At the beginning of 2022, he finally gives a release date for his first album with Christian content, Genelipsis, this date being January 20 of the same year.

Discography 
 2019: La Bestia
 2022: Genelipsis

References 

1995 births
Living people
Cuban emigrants to Puerto Rico
Cuban emigrants to the United States
Cuban rappers
Puerto Rican rappers
Latin trap musicians
Reggaeton musicians